The Kwik Fit British Touring Car Championship is a touring car racing series held each year in the United Kingdom, currently organised and administered by TOCA. It was established in 1958 as the British Saloon Car Championship and was renamed as the British Touring Car Championship for the 1987 season. The championship, currently running Next Generation Touring Car regulations, has been run to various national and international regulations over the years including FIA Group 2, FIA Group 5, FIA Group 1, FIA Group A, FIA Super Touring and FIA Super 2000. A lower-key Group N class for production cars ran from 2000 until 2003.

History

Early years 

The championship was initially run with a mix of classes, divided according to engine capacity, racing simultaneously. This often meant that a driver who chose the right class could win the overall championship without any chance of overall race wins, thereby devaluing the title for the spectators – for example, in the 1980s Chris Hodgetts won two overall titles in a small Toyota Corolla prepared by Hughes Of Beaconsfield, at that time a Mercedes-Benz/Toyota main dealer when most of the race wins were going to much larger cars; and while the Ford Sierra Cosworth RS500s were dominating at the front of the field, Frank Sytner took a title in a Class B BMW M3 and John Cleland's first title was won in a small Class C Vauxhall Astra.

Modern era

Super Touring cars 

In 1990, the BTCC introduced a class for cars with an engine displacement up to 2.0 litres which would later be adopted by the Fédération Internationale de l'Automobile and become the Super Touring regulations that were used in various championships in Europe and around the world. In their first year, these cars were run alongside a second class which continued to allow larger engines and was once again dominated by the Ford Sierra Cosworth RS500, however from 1991 they became the only cars eligible to compete. The new one-class system was popular with manufacturers from the beginning with six manufacturer supported teams from BMW, Ford, Mitsubishi, Nissan, Toyota and Vauxhall entered in the championship. During the first seasons, the cars were not fitted with aerodynamic aids such as a front splitter or a rear wing which were allowed from 1995 after Alfa Romeo caused controversy a year earlier, when they entered the 155 fitted with a rear wing – an item that was delivered with the road-going version of the 155, however unfitted in its boot. Audi joined the BTCC in 1996 with its four-wheel drive A4 Quattro, and went on to take that year's title.
The continuously high number of manufacturer-backed teams meant rapid development on the cars and quickly growing costs to compete which caused several manufacturers to withdraw from the championship until the 2000 season, when only Ford, Honda and Vauxhall remained in the championship.
To this day, the 'super touring era' during the 1990s is still looked at as the most successful period of the BTCC. The high number of manufacturer-backed teams provided very close competition, close and hard-fought racing on track and many spectators at the circuits.

BTC Touring and Super 2000 cars 
 In order to reduce the costs to compete in the championship, the organisers introduced new regulations for the 2001 season. The BTC Touring regulations cut costs dramatically but both manufacturer and spectator interest was low. The Super 2000 rules were adopted for the 2007 season. The 2000s saw cheaper cars than the later Supertouring era, with fewer factory teams and fewer international drivers.

Next Generation Touring Car 

In 2009, the BTCC released details of its Next Generation Touring Car (NGTC) specification, to be introduced from 2011. The introduction of these new technical regulations were designed to dramatically reduce the design, build and running costs of the cars and engines as well as reducing the potential for significant performance disparities between cars. The NGTC specification also aimed to cut costs by reducing reliance on WTCC/S2000 equipment, due to increasing costs/complexity and concerns as to its future sustainability and direction.

Current NGTC cars 
Currently, the cars used are a mix of 2.0 L saloons (sedans) such as the BMW 3-Series and Infiniti Q50, and hatchback cars such as the Honda Civic, Toyota Corolla and Ford Focus, based on models from a variety of manufacturers, using NGTC regulations. S2000 cars continued running in the Jack Sears Trophy until the 2014 season.

Teams 
BTCC teams are a mixture of manufacturer entries (currently BMW and Toyota) and independent teams such as BTC Racing, and Motorbase Performance.

In 2010, following Vauxhall's decision to pull out of the series, there were two new works teams, : Chevrolet, run by RML; and Honda, run by Team Dynamics.

In 2005, Team Dynamics became the first independent outfit to win the BTCC drivers and team championships; Matt Neal won the overall and independent drivers contests in his Team Dynamics Honda Integra. This included finishing all 30 championship races that year, something no other driver had achieved before and only equalled by Adam Morgan some 10 years later in 2015. This ended Vauxhall's run of 4 victories in the drivers and teams championships between 2001 and 2004. Neal and Dynamics were also victorious in 2006, before Vauxhall won the 2007 title with Italian Fabrizio Giovanardi. Team Dynamics also achieved the first overall independents race win in the 'Supertouring' era when Neal won a round of the 1999 BTCC at Donington Park, earning the team prize-money of £250,000.

As a result of Matt Neal's championship victories, and the fact that Team Dynamics were designing and building their own S2000 Honda Civic Type R (with unofficial support from Honda), they were no longer entered into the Independents category, and were classed as neither an "independent" or "works" team until the 2009 season, when the Manufacturers championship was renamed Manufacturers/Constructors Championship to allow both Team Aon and Team Dynamics to compete with at the time the sole works entry of Vauxhall.

Car regulations

Current regulations
As of the 2014 British Touring Car Championship, all cars are built to the same regulations:
Next Generation Touring Car. New set of regulations specifically developed for the BTCC as a way of moving the sport forward and cut costs for competitors. Introduced from 2011, these new technical regulations were designed to dramatically reduce the design, build and running costs of the cars and engines as well as reduce reliance on WTCC/S2000 equipment. NGTC cars initially maintained performance parity with S2000 cars until the 2013 season when full NGTC cars became the main championship class with Hybrid S2000/NGTC cars running in a secondary class. From the 2014 season, only NGTC cars are eligible to compete in the BTCC.

Cost control measures 
There are strict limits to the modifications which can be made to the cars, which are intended to reduce the cost of running a competitive team, which had become prohibitive in the final years of the Super Touring rules. These cost reductions saw a rise in independent entries – teams or individuals entering cars purchased from the manufacturer teams when they update their chassis.

With the introduction of the NGTC rules, all cars share a number of common components provided through a contract with RML Group. This has allowed many independent teams to enter without the need for manufacturer support, and negating the need to source ex-works cars.
Teams can install an engine from their marque's broad 'family' of cars, or opt to lease an engine from TOCA, built by Swindon Engines which also helps to make the cost of entry more affordable.

To further keep costs in check, the BTCC uses a single tyre supplier, with Dunlop the current supplier of rubber to all the teams. For dry races, the Dunlop SportMaxx Prime tyre is used, along with the use of the Option tyre (Soft/Hard) mandated at one race each meeting. For wet races, the Dunlop SportMaxx BluResponse tyre is used.

Fuels 
The rules previously allowed for a variety of different fuels in a bid to encourage more efficient cars. In 2004 Mardi Gras Motorsport independently entered a Liquified petroleum gas powered Super 2000 Honda Civic Type-R (which was subsequently replaced by a more competitive BTC-Touring Peugeot 406 Coupé, still LPG powered), and in 2005 Tech-Speed Motorsport converted an ex-works Vauxhall Astra Coupé to run on bio-ethanol fuel. In the middle of 2006, Kartworld's owner-driver Jason Hughes converted his 4-cylinder MG ZS to run on Bio-Ethanol, soon followed by the West Surrey Racing cars of championship contender Colin Turkington and Rob Collard, and for the final event at Silverstone, Richard Marsh converted his Peugeot 307 to run on bio-ethanol fuel. Only Hughes continued on this fuel in 2007 and 2008.
The regulations also permitted cars to run on diesel; attempted first in the 2007 season by Rick Kerry in a BMW 120d E87 run by Team AFM Racing. In 2008 SEAT Sport UK entered two Turbo Diesel Power SEAT Leons – the first diesel powered manufacturer entered cars.
At the start of the 2010 season, it was announced that Team AON racing had converted both of their Ford Focus ST cars to run on LPG.

Under current NGTC regulations, all entrants use Carless HiperFlo 300 which is a 101/102 RON and 89/90 MON unleaded gasoline with approximately 2% oxygen content that meets the FIA 'Appendix J' gasoline specification.

Previous regulations
The following regulations have been applied to the championship:
1958 – unique BTCC regulations
1959 – FIA Appendix J Category C
1960 – 'silhouette' special saloon cars (1000cc)
1961 to 1965 – FIA Group 2
1966 to 1969 – FIA Group 5
1970 to 1973 – FIA Group 2
1974 to 1983 – FIA Group 1
1983 to 1990 – FIA Group A
1991 to 2000 – 2 Litre Touring Car Formula, later becoming FIA Super Touring
2001 to 2011 – BTC Touring. The BTCC developed and introduced this specification in 2001, in response to the spiralling costs of the Super Touring specification. However, with the Super 2000 specification being used in the newly reformed World Touring Car Championship, the popularity of the BTC-T spec with top teams and manufactures was short lived. Therefore, from the 2007 season, BTC-T spec cars were no longer allowed to win the championship outright. The 2010 season was meant to be the last year BTC-T cars would be eligible to enter the championship, however Series Director Alan Gow announced a one-year extension to allow BTC-T to compete in 2011 (with their base-weight +50 kg on the 2010 season). Only cars that competed in 2010 would be eligible to race in 2011.
2004 to 2013 – Super 2000. Regulations first introduced to the BTCC in 2004, allowing teams to build cars eligible to race in several different Touring Car Championships, including the World Touring Car Championship. Car built to this specification were eligible to compete until the end of the 2013 season, however the last fully S2000 cars were entered in the 2011 season.
2010 to 2013 – S2000/NGTC Hybrid. From the 2010 season, teams with S2000 chassis were allowed to use an NGTC engine with their car. As of the 2012 season, all teams with S2000 chassis, used NGTC turbo charged engines. This hybrid specification was eligible until the end of the 2013 season.

Circuits

Being a national championship, the British Touring Car Championship has visited circuits throughout the United Kingdom over its long history. Currently the series visits eight different tracks in England and Scotland over the course of ten meetings. These tracks are: Brands Hatch (Indy Layout), Donington Park, Thruxton (the fastest track ever visited by the BTCC, with an average speed of 111.31 mph, set by Andrew Jordan during qualifying in 2014), Oulton Park, Croft, Snetterton, Knockhill, and Silverstone (National and International layouts), with a return to Brands Hatch (GP Layout) at the end of the season.

In the past, the BTCC has visited Mondello Park in Ireland and Pembrey in Wales. A street race around the city of Birmingham known as the Birmingham Superprix, was held in 1989 and 1990.

Aintree, Crystal Palace, Goodwood, Ingliston, Mallory Park and Rockingham have also hosted rounds in the past.

Race format

On the Saturday of a race weekend there are two practice sessions followed by a 30-minute qualifying session which determines the starting order for the first race on the Sunday, the fastest driver lining up in pole position.

Each race typically consists of between 16 and 25 laps, depending on the length of the circuit. A race may be extended by three laps if three or more laps have been run behind a safety car.

The grid for race two is based on the finishing order of race one. For race three, a draw takes place to decide at which place the grid is 'reversed'. This means drivers finishing race two in positions 6th through 12th could take pole position for race 3 depending on the outcome of the draw. For example, if ball number 7 is drawn, the driver finishing in 7th position in race two starts on pole, 6th place starts in second place, 5th place starts in third etc. Drivers finishing in 8th place and beyond would start race three in their finishing order for race two. The draw is normally conducted by a celebrity or VIP, live on TV. For 2014, this was changed so that the driver who finished Race 2 in 10th position made the draw. Fabrizio Giovanardi has twice managed to put himself on pole position by drawing out number 10.

Before 2006, the driver finishing in 10th place in race two took pole position for race three. This initiated deliberate race 'fixing', whereby some drivers attempted to finished in 10th place during race two to gain pole position in race three. This "reverse grid" rule polarised opinion: some fans enjoy the spectacle afforded by having unlikely drivers on pole position while faster ones have to battle through the field; others feel it detracts from the purity of the racing. For example, some drivers might decide to slow down and let others pass them, thereby improving their own starting position for the "reverse grid" race, which is contrary to the spirit of motor racing – which is to try to come first in every race. It also led to some safety concerns as drivers would slow dramatically on the approach to the finish line, with cars behind forced to take evasive action to avoid collecting slower cars ahead. These factors contributed the rule change for the 2006 season.

Points system

Current points system
Points are awarded to the top fifteen drivers in each race as follows:

No driver may collect more than one "Lead a Lap" point per race no matter how many laps they lead.

Previous points system
Points are awarded to the top ten drivers in each race as follows:

No driver may collect more than one "Lead a Lap" point per race no matter how many laps they lead.

Television coverage
The BBC screened highlights of every race from 1988 to 2001. The F1 commentator at the time, Murray Walker, commentated. From 1997, some races were screened live with Charlie Cox joining Murray Walker. After 1997 the commentary team was Charlie Cox and John Watson with Murray Walker dedicating his time to Formula 1.

In the UK, ITV covered the series from 2002, with commentary from Ben Edwards and former champion Tim Harvey, with Toby Moody replacing Edwards after he replaced Martin Brundle on the BBC's F1 coverage in 2012 and David Addison replaced Toby Moody for the 2013 season. In 2006 the ITV coverage included highlights from the first and second race of the day and live coverage of the third and final race. This returned in the second half of 2007, after the first five meetings had been on ITV3 (a digital channel with fewer viewers), with a half-hour late-night highlights show. ITV also has a Sunday night show called Motorsport UK, featuring many of the supporting races. From 2008, the races were screened live on ITV4, along with the support races. 

The series is screened in other countries. In Australia, Fox Sports Australia have been covering the BTCC championship since 2000. From 2009 the ITV coverage has screened on ONE HD. Speed TV screened several seasons in the USA over the winter, but this ended when the network became Fox Sports 1 in 2013. BTCC returned to the air in the US with the 2015 season, being aired on CBS Sports Network in condensed, one-hour packages like those aired on Speed. Unlike Speed's offering as the series being winter programming filling the void after the American racing season, CBSSN airs events a week or so after their actual running.

Motors TV used to show all the races live, including some support races, both in the UK and across Europe. In 2007 Setanta Sports showed all the races live, including the support races; this ceased when the entire day's coverage moved to ITV4.

The current coverage consists of Saturday's Qualifying Sessions and support races live on ITV Hub. Sunday coverage starts an hour before Race 1 and finishes after Race 3. All of Sunday's Coverage is aired on ITV4. ITV has a one-hour highlights programme on the Monday night following the race.

Live timing
Live timing for the BTCC and its support races, as well as testing, is provided by Timing Solutions Ltd from their website. This service allows you to follow free practice and qualifying as well as race day action via a timing screen from your computer or mobile phone.

Previous champions

Currently, five championships are awarded per season. The overall driver's championship is the driver gaining the most points overall throughout the season. Since 1992, the Independents driver championship has also been awarded to the leading non-manufacturer-backed driver. There are also awards for the best overall team, leading manufacturer and, since 2005, the top independent team. Previous championship titles were awarded to the leading "Production" (or "Class B") driver and team between 2000 and 2003. The Jack Sears Trophy was introduced for the 2013 season and was awarded to the highest scoring driver competing in S2000 machinery. For 2014, with S2000 cars no longer eligible to compete, it was awarded to the drive that had made up the most places from their grid position throughout the season. From the 2015 season the Jack Sears Trophy has been awarded to the highest placed rookie driver at the end of the season. For the 60th anniversary year in 2018, any driver who had yet to take an overall podium was eligible to contest the Jack Sears Trophy.

Manufacturers'/Constructors' championship winners (1991–present)

Series sponsors
The BTCC has had several championship sponsors over the years.

Manufacturer/Constructor Entries
The BTCC features entries with the backing, funding and technical support of a motor manufacturer. This may be a motor racing team running cars on behalf of the manufacturer or cars being run directly by the factory. Below is a timeline of manufacturer/constructor entries from the beginning of the 2-litre era.

Support races
Each BTCC race meeting, the crowds are kept further entertained by the appearance of high-profile supporting championships, known as the TOCA Support Package, from the manufacturers Ford, Ginetta, Porsche and Renault.

TOCA support package

The TOCA Support Package consists of five main support championships, which support the championship at almost every round, along with several smaller championships supporting one or two events. All the support championships are either Single Make Championships or Formula racing.

After previously supported the BTCC in the late 1990s and then in 2013 and 2014, the British Formula Ford Championship announced that it was folding to become the MSA Formula, the FIA's Formula 4 championship in the UK for the 2015 season. Known as F4 British Championship from 2016, the championship uses Mygale carbon-fibre monocoque chassis and a Ford 1.6L EcoBoost engine as used in the more modern Formula Ford cars.

The Ginetta GT Supercup is a GT style, multi class championship. The main class is the G55 class, utilising Ginetta's G55 car. The second class, known as the G50 class, utilises the older and less powerful Ginetta G50. Most weekends in 2013 see three Supercup races with a few rounds hosting only two races. Ginetta also run a championship on the support package that caters for up and coming young talent in the form of the Ginetta Junior Championship. These 14- to 17-year-olds race in identical Ginetta G40J cars with strict regulations which help keep costs down. In 2013, the championship with run two races at all BTCC weekends.

Out of all the current support series, the Porsche Carrera Cup GB is the longest serving support championship. Drivers compete in identical Porsche 911 GT3 Cup (Type 997) cars which produce 450 bhp. The three tier championship splits drivers according to their racing experience. Professional drivers compete in the Pro class, with semi-professional and amateur drivers racing in either Pro-Am1 or Pro-Am2. From 2013, the Carrera Cup has held two races at each BTCC meeting.

Finally, the Renault Clio Cup UK allows aspiring touring car drivers to showcase their talent in this single make series, utilising Clio Renaultsport 200 cars. The championship awards three different titles for drivers. Along with the overall drivers' championship, younger rookie drivers can chase points for the Graduate Cup and older gentlemen drivers can seek points for the Masters Cup. During 2013, the Clio Cup will hold two races at all BTCC weekends except the rounds at Croft and Knockhill.

For 2020, the Renault Clio Cup UK has been replaced by the Mini Challenge, which joins from the British GT package. The Clio Cup has joined the British GT Package instead.

Previous support races

Formula Renault UK - Early in 2012, the long supporting Formula Renault UK championship announced that it had cancelled its 2012 season after only receiving six entries and hoped to return for the 2013 season. However, it was reported in the media that the series was ended definitively in September 2012.
SEAT Cupra Championship - was a one make series that ran for six years between 2003 and 2008, and as a support package to the BTCC between 2004 and 2008. The series folded after SEAT UK ended its racing activities.
Formula BMW UK
Renault Spider Cup
Formula Vauxhall
Formula Vauxhall Junior
Lotus Elise Championship
Vauxhall Vectra Championship
Ford Fiesta Championship

See also
List of British Touring Car Championship records

References

External links

Official site
BTCC Crazy
BTCCPages.com
SuperTouring.co.uk
SuperTouringRegister.com
SuperTouringCars.net
FIA STC Article 262
TouringCarTimes.com
BTCC Spotters Guide PDF Download
Le Touring, Sauce Européenne BTCC, WTCC, DTM and STCC news, rumors and results (In French)
The Checkered Flag – BTCC news, rumours, interviews and more
TouringCarRacing.net
SpeedFreaks.org
BTCC Russia Russian Fan site
BTCCHUB BTCCHUB.net – Your BTCC Pit Stop (Beta)
btcctechnical.wordpress.com
Relight the fire - Motorsport Magazine, October 2011

 
Touring car racing series
1958 establishments in the United Kingdom
Recurring sporting events established in 1958
National championships in the United Kingdom